CIPA or variation, may stand for:

People
Given named
 Cipa Glazman Dichter, Brazilian concert pianist

Surnamed
 Cemil Çıpa (born 1988), Turkish race driver
 Larry Cipa (born 1951), U.S. American football player

Places
 Companhia Industrial Pastoril Agrícola (Cipa/CIPA), a Brazilian colonization effort, that resulted in São Pedro da Cipa, Mato Grosso, Brazil

Companies, organizations, groups
 Camera & Imaging Products Association, Japan-based organization
 Canadian International Pharmacy Association
 Center for International Political Analysis, research center at the University of Kansas
 Chartered Institute of Patent Attorneys, United Kingdom body of patent attorneys
 China Investment Promotion Agency
 CIPA (organization) (originally ), ICOMOS scientific committee for heritage documentation
 CIPA-TV, a television station in Prince Albert, Saskatchewan
 Companies and Intellectual Property Authority
 Cornell Institute for Public Affairs, MPA program at Cornell University
 Cyprus Investment Promotion Agency

Other uses
 Children's Internet Protection Act, United States federal law 
 Classified Information Procedures Act, United States federal law 
 Congenital insensitivity to pain with anhidrosis, a rare neural disorder
 cipa, a Polish profanity

See also